Kastamonu Airport  is an airport located in the city of Kastamonu, Turkey. It was inaugurated on 5 July 2013 with the first Turkish Airlines flight incoming from Istanbul.

Airlines and destinations

Traffic Statistics

References

External links
 Turkish Airlines' KFS page

 

Airports in Turkey
Kastamonu
Buildings and structures in Kastamonu Province
Transport in Kastamonu Province